Michael Watt (born March 31, 1976) is a Canadian former professional ice hockey player who played for four different National Hockey League teams.

Playing career
Mike Watt was drafted by the Edmonton Oilers in the 1994 NHL Entry Draft in the second round, 34th overall. He spent the next three seasons playing in the NCAA for Michigan State University. He joined the Oilers for the 1997–98 season.

Watt appeared in 14 games for the Oilers in 1997-98, recording 3 points. On June 18, 1998, he was traded to the New York Islanders in exchange for Eric Fichaud. Watt would play 120 games for Isles. He was placed on waivers and claimed by the Nashville Predators on May 23, 2000. After only 18 games with the Preds, he was traded to the Philadelphia Flyers for Mikhail Chernov on May 24, 2001. After joining Philadelphia, he suffered a shoulder injury during an exhibition game. He did not play again in the NHL until he suited up for five games for the Carolina Hurricanes in 2002–03. In 2003, he moved to Europe, spending two seasons in the Russian Super League with SKA St. Petersburg and one season in Sweden's Elitserien with Leksands IF.

Coaching career
In 2014, he became an assistant coach with the Amarillo Bulls of the North American Hockey League for one season. He then joined the Bloomington Thunder in the United States Hockey League as an assistant. He became the head coach of the team formerly known as the Thunder, the Central Illinois Flying Aces, in 2017, a position he held until the team folded in 2019. In 2021, he was named the head coach of the Vermilion County Bobcats expansion team in the Southern Professional Hockey League, but left after one game.

Personal life

Watt was born in Seaforth, Ontario and raised in Egmondville, Ontario.

Career statistics

Regular season and playoffs

International

Awards and honours

References

External links

1976 births
Living people
Canadian expatriate ice hockey players in Russia
Canadian expatriate ice hockey players in Sweden
Canadian ice hockey forwards
Carolina Hurricanes players
Edmonton Oilers draft picks
Edmonton Oilers players
Grand Rapids Griffins players
Hamilton Bulldogs (AHL) players
Ice hockey people from Ontario
Leksands IF players
Lowell Lock Monsters players
Michigan State Spartans men's ice hockey players
Milwaukee Admirals (IHL) players
Muskegon Fury players
Nashville Predators players
New York Islanders players
People from Huron County, Ontario
Philadelphia Phantoms players
SKA Saint Petersburg players